Sankovo-Medvezhye (Sańkova-Miadzviežža) is a Russian exclave surrounded by Belarus (with an area of 454 hectares, 4.5 km2 or 1.7 sq mi). It is situated in the east of Dobrush Raion of Homiel Voblast, 5 km from the Russian village of Dobrodeyevka. Sankovo-Medvezhye is a part of Zlynkovsky District of Bryansk Oblast and is just 800 m ( mi) from the Belarusian–Russian border, from which it is separated by marshes. The name of the exclave comes from the villages Sankovo and Medvezhye, which existed in this area during Soviet times.

History
At the beginning of the 20th century settlers from the neighboring village of Dobrodeyevka left in search of jobs in the United States. Having worked as miners in Pennsylvania, they returned before World War I broke out. New farmers bought holdings and established individual farms.

In 1926, during the administrative reform, the state border between the Byelorussian Soviet Republic and Russian Soviet Republic was moved to the east but administratively the villages Sankovo and Medvezhye became a part of Russia's Bryansk Oblast.

During World War II, the Germans destroyed these villages, but after the war Russians re-settled the region.

Current status 
Due to the nuclear disaster that occurred in Chernobyl in 1986 this area is abandoned. Housing and any other activity are now completely forbidden.

The Russian Federation still officially has jurisdiction over the area.

See also
Kaliningrad oblast
Dubki, Pechorsky District, Pskov Oblast

References

External links
Sankovo-Medvezhye (Russian exclave in Belarus)

Enclaves and exclaves
Geography of Bryansk Oblast
Geography of Gomel Region
Belarus–Russia border